The 2022 NCHC Tournament was the ninth tournament in league history. It was played between March 11 and 19, 2022. Quarterfinal games were played at home team campus sites, while the final four matches were held at the Xcel Energy Center in Saint Paul, Minnesota. As the tournament winner, Minnesota Duluth earned the NCHC's automatic bid to the 2022 NCAA Division I Men's Ice Hockey Tournament.

Format
The first round of the postseason tournament featured a best-of-three games format. All eight conference teams participated in the tournament. Teams were seeded No. 1 through No. 8 according to their final conference standing, with a tiebreaker system used to seed teams with an identical number of points accumulated. The top four seeded teams each earn home ice and host one of the lower seeded teams.

The winners of the first round series advanced to the Xcel Energy Center for the NCHC Frozen Faceoff. The Frozen Faceoff used a single-elimination format. Teams were re-seeded No. 1 through No. 4 according to the final regular season conference standings.

Standings

Bracket
Teams are reseeded for the Semifinals

* denotes overtime periods

Results

Quarterfinals

(1) Denver vs. (8) Miami

(2) North Dakota vs. (7) Colorado College

(3) Western Michigan vs. (6) Omaha

(4) St. Cloud State vs. (5) Minnesota Duluth

Semifinals

(1) Denver vs. (5) Minnesota Duluth

(2) North Dakota vs. (3) Western Michigan

Championship

(3) Western Michigan vs. (5) Minnesota Duluth

Tournament awards

Frozen Faceoff All-Tournament Team
F: Blake Biondi (Minnesota Duluth)
F: Ty Glover (Western Michigan)
F: Dominic James (Minnesota Duluth)
D: Ronnie Attard (Western Michigan)
D: Wyatt Kaiser (Minnesota Duluth)
G: Ryan Fanti* (Minnesota Duluth)
* Most Valuable Player(s)

References

NCHC Tournament
National Collegiate Hockey Conference Tournament
College sports in Minnesota
Ice hockey competitions in Saint Paul, Minnesota
NCHC Tournament
NCHC Tournament